The 1988 Fresno State Bulldogs baseball team represented Fresno State College in the 1988 NCAA Division I baseball season. The Bulldogs played their home games at Pete Beiden Field. The team was coached by Bob Bennett in his 21st year as head coach at Fresno State.

The Bulldogs won the West I Regional to advance to the College World Series, where they were defeated by the Miami Hurricanes.

Roster

Schedule

|-
! style="" | Regular Season
|-

|-
! bgcolor="#DDDDFF" width="3%" | #
! bgcolor="#DDDDFF" width="7%" | Date
! bgcolor="#DDDDFF" width="14%" | Opponent
! bgcolor="#DDDDFF" width="25%" | Site/Stadium
! bgcolor="#DDDDFF" width="5%" | Score
! bgcolor="#DDDDFF" width="5%" | Overall Record
! bgcolor="#DDDDFF" width="5%" | PCAA Record
|- align="center" bgcolor="#ffcccc"
| 1 || February 2 ||  || Pete Beiden Field • Fresno, California || 8–9 || 0–1 || –
|- align="center" bgcolor="#ccffcc"
| 2 || February 3 || Cal Poly Pomona || Pete Beiden Field • Fresno, California || 10–5 || 1–1 || –
|- align="center" bgcolor="#ccffcc"
| 3 || February 5 || at  || Evans Diamond • Berkeley, California || 14–12 || 2–1 || –
|- align="center" bgcolor="#ffcccc"
| 4 || February 6 || at California || Evans Diamond • Berkeley, California || 12–15 || 2–2 || –
|- align="center" bgcolor="#ffcccc"
| 5 || February 7 || at California || Evans Diamond • Berkeley, California || 5–6 || 2–3 || –
|- align="center" bgcolor="#ccffcc"
| 6 || February 13 || at  || John Cunningham Stadium • San Diego, California || 14–12 || 3–3 || –
|- align="center" bgcolor="#ccffcc"
| 7 || February 14 || at San Diego || John Cunningham Stadium • San Diego, California || 7–1 || 4–3 || –
|- align="center" bgcolor="#ffcccc"
| 8 || February 15 || at San Diego || John Cunningham Stadium • San Diego, California || 4–9 || 4–4 || –
|- align="center" bgcolor="#ccffcc"
| 9 || February 17 ||  || Pete Beiden Field • Fresno, California || 6–1 || 5–4 || –
|- align="center" bgcolor="#ccffcc"
| 10 || February 19 ||  || Pete Beiden Field • Fresno, California || 11–4 || 6–4 || –
|- align="center" bgcolor="#ccffcc"
| 11 || February 20 || St. Mary's || Pete Beiden Field • Fresno, California || 3–0 || 7–4 || –
|- align="center" bgcolor="#ccffcc"
| 12 || February 21 || St. Mary's || Pete Beiden Field • Fresno, California || 8–0 || 8–4 || –
|- align="center" bgcolor="#ffcccc"
| 13 || February 23 ||  || Pete Beiden Field • Fresno, California || 4–7 || 8–5 || –
|- align="center" bgcolor="#ccffcc"
| 14 || February 24 || Cal State Dominguez Hills || Pete Beiden Field • Fresno, California || 11–1 || 9–5 || –
|- align="center" bgcolor="#ccffcc"
| 15 || February 26 ||  || Pete Beiden Field • Fresno, California || 18–1 || 10–5 || –
|- align="center" bgcolor="#ccffcc"
| 16 || February 27 || Nevada || Pete Beiden Field • Fresno, California || 9–1 || 11–5 || –
|- align="center" bgcolor="#ccffcc"
| 17 || February 28 || Nevada || Pete Beiden Field • Fresno, California || 15–1 || 12–5 || –
|-

|-
! bgcolor="#DDDDFF" width="3%" | #
! bgcolor="#DDDDFF" width="7%" | Date
! bgcolor="#DDDDFF" width="14%" | Opponent
! bgcolor="#DDDDFF" width="25%" | Site/Stadium
! bgcolor="#DDDDFF" width="5%" | Score
! bgcolor="#DDDDFF" width="5%" | Overall Record
! bgcolor="#DDDDFF" width="5%" | PCAA Record
|- align="center" bgcolor="#ccffcc"
| 18 || March 1 ||  || Pete Beiden Field • Fresno, California || 7–4 || 13–5 || –
|- align="center" bgcolor="#ccffcc"
| 19 || March 2 || Cal State Los Angeles || Pete Beiden Field • Fresno, California || 14–4 || 14–5 || –
|- align="center" bgcolor="#ccffcc"
| 20 || March 4 ||  || Pete Beiden Field • Fresno, California || 11–5 || 15–5 || –
|- align="center" bgcolor="#ccffcc"
| 21 || March 5 || Gonzaga || Pete Beiden Field • Fresno, California || 8–7 || 16–5 || –
|- align="center" bgcolor="#ccffcc"
| 22 || March 6 || Gonzaga || Pete Beiden Field • Fresno, California || 15–5 || 17–5 || –
|- align="center" bgcolor="#ffcccc"
| 23 || March 8 ||  || Pete Beiden Field • Fresno, California || 2–5 || 17–6 || –
|- align="center" bgcolor="#ccffcc"
| 24 || March 9 || Cal State Northridge || Pete Beiden Field • Fresno, California || 10–3 || 18–6 || –
|- align="center" bgcolor="#ccffcc"
| 25 || March 12 ||  || Pete Beiden Field • Fresno, California || 10–7 || 19–6 || –
|- align="center" bgcolor="#ccffcc"
| 26 || March 14 ||  || Pete Beiden Field • Fresno, California || 6–5 || 20–6 || –
|- align="center" bgcolor="#ccffcc"
| 27 || March 15 ||  || Pete Beiden Field • Fresno, California || 17–2 || 21–6 || –
|- align="center" bgcolor="#ccffcc"
| 28 || March 16 ||  || Pete Beiden Field • Fresno, California || 12–10 || 22–6 || –
|- align="center" bgcolor="#ccffcc"
| 29 || March 17 ||  || Pete Beiden Field • Fresno, California || 13–10 || 23–6 || –
|- align="center" bgcolor="#ccffcc"
| 30 || March 18 ||  || Pete Beiden Field • Fresno, California || 7–4 || 24–6 || –
|- align="center" bgcolor="#ccffcc"
| 31 || March 19 || Texas A&M || Pete Beiden Field • Fresno, California || 4–0 || 25–6 || –
|- align="center" bgcolor="#ccffcc"
| 32 || March 22 || Stanford || Pete Beiden Field • Fresno, California || 13–3 || 26–6 || –
|- align="center" bgcolor="#ccffcc"
| 33 || March 25 ||  || Pete Beiden Field • Fresno, California || 19–0 || 27–6 || 1–0
|- align="center" bgcolor="#ccffcc"
| 34 || March 26 || Long Beach State || Pete Beiden Field • Fresno, California || 15–0 || 28–6 || 2–0
|- align="center" bgcolor="#ccffcc"
| 35 || March 27 || Long Beach State || Pete Beiden Field • Fresno, California || 14–3 || 29–6 || 3–0
|- align="center" bgcolor="#ccffcc"
| 36 || March 31 ||  || Pete Beiden Field • Fresno, California || 4–2 || 30–6 || 4–0
|-

|-
! bgcolor="#DDDDFF" width="3%" | #
! bgcolor="#DDDDFF" width="7%" | Date
! bgcolor="#DDDDFF" width="14%" | Opponent
! bgcolor="#DDDDFF" width="25%" | Site/Stadium
! bgcolor="#DDDDFF" width="5%" | Score
! bgcolor="#DDDDFF" width="5%" | Overall Record
! bgcolor="#DDDDFF" width="5%" | PCAA Record
|- align="center" bgcolor="#ccffcc"
| 37 || April 1 || UC Irvine || Pete Beiden Field • Fresno, California || 16–2 || 31–6 || 5–0
|- align="center" bgcolor="#ccffcc"
| 38 || April 2 || UC Irvine || Pete Beiden Field • Fresno, California || 4–0 || 32–6 || 6–0
|- align="center" bgcolor="#ccffcc"
| 39 || April 5 ||  || Pete Beiden Field • Fresno, California || 6–1 || 33–6 || 6–0
|- align="center" bgcolor="#ccffcc"
| 40 || April 6 || Loyola Marymount || Pete Beiden Field • Fresno, California || 18–6 || 34–6 || 6–0
|- align="center" bgcolor="#ccffcc"
| 41 || April 8 ||  || Pete Beiden Field • Fresno, California || 17–3 || 35–6 || 7–0
|- align="center" bgcolor="#ccffcc"
| 42 || April 9 || San Jose State || Pete Beiden Field • Fresno, California || 10–1 || 36–6 || 8–0
|- align="center" bgcolor="#ccffcc"
| 43 || April 10 || San Jose State || Pete Beiden Field • Fresno, California || 7–1 || 37–6 || 9–0
|- align="center" bgcolor="#ccffcc"
| 44 || April 12 || Cal Poly || Pete Beiden Field • Fresno, California || 17–7 || 38–6 || 9–0
|- align="center" bgcolor="#ccffcc"
| 45 || April 16 || at  || Caesar Uyesaka Stadium • Santa Barbara, California || 4–2 || 39–6 || 10–0
|- align="center" bgcolor="#ccffcc"
| 46 || April 17 || at UC Santa Barbara || Caesar Uyesaka Stadium • Santa Barbara, California || 8–5 || 40–6 || 11–0
|- align="center" bgcolor="#ccffcc"
| 47 || April 18 || at UC Santa Barbara || Caesar Uyesaka Stadium • Santa Barbara, California || 10–3 || 41–6 || 12–0
|- align="center" bgcolor="#ccffcc"
| 48 || April 23 || BYU || Pete Beiden Field • Fresno, California || 7–3 || 42–6 || 12–0
|- align="center" bgcolor="#ccffcc"
| 49 || April 24 ||  || Pete Beiden Field • Fresno, California || 4–1 || 43–6 || 13–0
|- align="center" bgcolor="#ccffcc"
| 50 || April 25 || Pacific || Pete Beiden Field • Fresno, California || 18–1 || 44–6 || 14–0
|- align="center" bgcolor="#ccffcc"
| 51 || April 26 || Pacific || Pete Beiden Field • Fresno, California || 14–6 || 45–6 || 15–0
|- align="center" bgcolor="#ccffcc"
| 52 || April 27 || Stanford || Pete Beiden Field • Fresno, California || 6–5 || 46–6 || 15–0
|- align="center" bgcolor="#ccffcc"
| 53 || April 29 || at  || Titan Field • Fullerton, California || 3–2 || 47–6 || 16–0
|- align="center" bgcolor="#ccffcc"
| 54 || April 30 || at Cal State Fullerton || Titan Field • Fullerton, California || 5–3 || 48–6 || 17–0
|-

|-
! bgcolor="#DDDDFF" width="3%" | #
! bgcolor="#DDDDFF" width="7%" | Date
! bgcolor="#DDDDFF" width="14%" | Opponent
! bgcolor="#DDDDFF" width="25%" | Site/Stadium
! bgcolor="#DDDDFF" width="5%" | Score
! bgcolor="#DDDDFF" width="5%" | Overall Record
! bgcolor="#DDDDFF" width="5%" | PCAA Record
|- align="center" bgcolor="#ccffcc"
| 55 || May 1 || at Cal State Fullerton || Titan Field • Fullerton, California || 15–8 || 49–6 || 18–0
|- align="center" bgcolor="#ffcccc"
| 56 || May 3 || at  || Buck Shaw Stadium • Santa Clara, California || 9–10 || 49–7 || 18–0
|- align="center" bgcolor="#ffcccc"
| 57 || May 4 || at Santa Clara || Buck Shaw Stadium • Santa Clara, California || 3–4 || 49–8 || 18–0
|- align="center" bgcolor="#ffcccc"
| 58 || May 6 || at  || Roger Barnson Field • Paradise, Nevada || 8–12 || 49–9 || 18–1
|- align="center" bgcolor="#ccffcc"
| 59 || May 7 || at UNLV || Roger Barnson Field • Paradise, Nevada || 9–4 || 50–9 || 19–1
|- align="center" bgcolor="#ccffcc"
| 60 || May 8 || at UNLV || Roger Barnson Field • Paradise, Nevada || 11–6 || 51–9 || 20–1
|-

|-
! style="" | Postseason
|-

|-
! bgcolor="#DDDDFF" width="3%" | #
! bgcolor="#DDDDFF" width="7%" | Date
! bgcolor="#DDDDFF" width="14%" | Opponent
! bgcolor="#DDDDFF" width="25%" | Site/Stadium
! bgcolor="#DDDDFF" width="5%" | Score
! bgcolor="#DDDDFF" width="5%" | Overall Record
! bgcolor="#DDDDFF" width="5%" | PCAA Record
|- align="center" bgcolor="#ccffcc"
| 61 || May 26 ||  || Pete Beiden Field • Fresno, California || 10–8 || 52–9 || 20–1
|- align="center" bgcolor="#ccffcc"
| 62 || May 27 || BYU || Pete Beiden Field • Fresno, California || 7–6 || 53–9 || 20–1
|- align="center" bgcolor="#ffcccc"
| 63 || May 28 ||  || Pete Beiden Field • Fresno, California || 17–18 || 53–10 || 20–1
|- align="center" bgcolor="#ccffcc"
| 64 || May 29 ||  || Pete Beiden Field • Fresno, California || 7–6 || 54–10 || 20–1
|- align="center" bgcolor="#ccffcc"
| 65 || May 30 || Southern California || Pete Beiden Field • Fresno, California || 17–12 || 55–10 || 20–1
|- align="center" bgcolor="#ccffcc"
| 66 || May 30 || Southern California || Pete Beiden Field • Fresno, California || 14–3 || 56–10 || 20–1
|-

|-
! bgcolor="#DDDDFF" width="3%" | #
! bgcolor="#DDDDFF" width="7%" | Date
! bgcolor="#DDDDFF" width="14%" | Opponent
! bgcolor="#DDDDFF" width="25%" | Site/Stadium
! bgcolor="#DDDDFF" width="5%" | Score
! bgcolor="#DDDDFF" width="5%" | Overall Record
! bgcolor="#DDDDFF" width="5%" | PCAA Record
|- align="center" bgcolor="#ffcccc"
| 67 || June 2 || vs Stanford || Johnny Rosenblatt Stadium • Omaha, Nebraska || 3–10 || 56–11 || 20–1
|- align="center" bgcolor="#ffcccc"
| 68 || June 3 || vs Miami (FL) || Johnny Rosenblatt Stadium • Omaha, Nebraska || 4–8 || 56–12 || 20–1
|-

|-
|

Awards and honors
Rich Crane
Third Team All-American Baseball America
First Team All-PCAA

Tom Goodwin
First Team All-American American Baseball Coaches Association
First Team All-American Baseball America
First Team All-West I Regional
First Team All-PCAA

Steve Hosey
Third Team All-American Baseball America
First Team All-PCAA

Jeff Mott
Second Team All-PCAA

Steve Pearse
First Team All-American American Baseball Coaches Association
First Team All-West I Regional
First Team All-PCAA

John Salles
First Team All-American American Baseball Coaches Association
Second Team All-American Baseball America
First Team All-West I Regional
First Team All-PCAA

Erik Schullstrom
First Team Freshman All-American Baseball America
First Team All-PCAA

Lance Shebelut
First Team All-American American Baseball Coaches Association
First Team All-American Baseball America
First Team All-West I Regional
First Team All-PCAA
Pacific Coast Athletic Association Player of the Year

Eddie Zosky
First Team All-West I Regional
First Team All-PCAA

References

Fresno State Bulldogs baseball seasons
Fresno State Bulldogs baseball
College World Series seasons
Fresno State
Big West Conference baseball champion seasons
Fresno State